The 2013 Al Ain bus accident occurred on 4 February 2013 when a bus carrying 46 people from Pakistan, India and Bangladesh, collided with another vehicle in the Zakhir district of the city of Al Ain, Abu Dhabi (emirate). At least 22 people died and another 24 were injured in the accident.

References

2013 in the United Arab Emirates
Al Ain bus accident
February 2013 events in Asia
History of the Emirate of Abu Dhabi
Road incidents in the United Arab Emirates